The Lebanese Special Operations Command (LSOCOM) ( Kiyadat al Kouwat al Khasa al Loubnanya) is the joint Special Operations command of the Lebanese Armed Forces which groups Lebanon's elite units. The command is part of the Lebanese Armed Forces.

Background

The command was founded as a result of the lessons the army learned in the Nahr el Bared Operation.  The Lebanese Special Forces spearheaded the attack on the camp in which 169 soldiers died and were the workhorse in the battle and the key to the success of the campaign. Nahr el Bared was the first occasion where these regiments were able to prove themselves capable, especially at counter-terrorism operations, which prompted the Lebanese Army Command to start planning to expand them.

Structure
The LSOCOM includes Lebanon's 4 Special Forces Regiments:
 Marine Commandos Regiment
 Commando Regiment (Also known as the Maghaweer)
 Lebanese Air Assault Regiment 
 Counter-Sabotage (Moukafaha) Branch and the Strike Force (Kouwa el-Dareba) Anti-Terrorism Branch

Future
At formation, the size of the force was around 5,000 soldiers; however, the plan is to build a force the size of two to three brigades.

See also
 Tomb of the Unknown Soldier in Lebanon

References

Military units and formations of Lebanon
Counterterrorism
Military units and formations established in 2008